Harry Thorneycroft (21 February 1892 – 7 March 1956) was a British hairdresser and Labour Party politician who sat in the House of Commons from 1942 to 1955.

He was educated at an elementary school, and began work in a hairdresser's shop at the age of 9. He later became President of the National Federation of Hairdressers.

During the First World War, he served overseas with the Royal Field Artillery. He was elected to Manchester City Council in 1923, and became an alderman in 1939.

Thorneycroft unsuccessfully contested the borough of Blackpool at the 1935 general election, and was elected to Parliament seven years later at a Manchester Clayton by-election in October 1942 after the death of the Labour MP John Jagger. During the Second World War, the parties in the coalition government did not contest by-elections when vacancies occurred in seats held by their coalition partners, but in the Clayton by-election Thorneycroft was opposed by an independent candidate, Major Hammond Foot. Thorneycroft received a letter of support signed by the Prime Minister, Winston Churchill, and the leaders of the other coalition parties. He was the first Labour candidate to receive such a letter, and won the seat with 93.3% of the votes.

He held the seat until the constituency was abolished for the 1955 general election, when he retired from Parliament.

From 1945 to 1947, he was Parliamentary Private Secretary (PPS) to Lord Pethick-Lawrence, the Secretary of State for India and Burma. He was then PPS to Arthur Henderson, the Secretary of State for Air, from 1947 until the Labour Government left office in 1951.

He died in hospital in London on 7 March 1956, aged 64.

References

External links 

1892 births
1956 deaths
Labour Party (UK) MPs for English constituencies
UK MPs 1935–1945
UK MPs 1945–1950
UK MPs 1950–1951
UK MPs 1951–1955
Councillors in Manchester
British Army personnel of World War I
British hairdressers
Royal Field Artillery soldiers